Fultang Bilingual High School is a private bilingual (French and English) secondary school high school in Nkongsamba, Cameroon, founded in 2003 by Blaesius Fultang.

The school
The school is found in Nkongsamba, located in the central west of Cameroon. It is mainly a boarding school though it has a day-school section for lower classes. The English section runs from Form 1 to Upper Sixth and the French section goes from 6eme to Terminale. In 2009 the school had the best student in the nation at the mid-year high school exams that is GCE O level and in 2010 the school received the title GCE School, meaning one of the best 10 schools in the country that year following its 100% performance at the national exams.

Founder 
The founder Blaesius Fultang is an international conference speaker. He and his wife Helen Fultang co-founded the school in 2003.

External links
 http://www.fultangschool.com

Educational institutions established in 2003
Secondary schools in Cameroon
2003 establishments in Cameroon
Nkongsamba